St Augustine's, Ramsgate may refer to:

Pugin's Church and Shrine of St Augustine, otherwise known as St Augustine's Church.
St Augustine's Abbey, Ramsgate, a former Benedictine abbey in Ramsgate.